Qarah Gol (also Romanized as Qareh Gol) is a village in Dasht Rural District, in the Central District of Meshgin Shahr County, Ardabil Province, Iran. At the 2006 census, its population was 349, in 65 families.

References 

Towns and villages in Meshgin Shahr County